Thetford Priory is a Cluniac monastic house in Thetford, Norfolk, England. Founded in 1103 by Roger Bigod of Norfolk, Thetford was one of the most important monasteries of East Anglia.

It should not be confused with the Dominican Friary of Blackfriars, Thetford that later became part of Thetford Grammar School.

History

One of the most important East Anglian monasteries, Thetford Priory was founded in 1103 by Roger Bigod of Norfolk, in lieu of a vow of pilgrimage to the Holy Land. The abandoned cathedral church of the East Anglian bishops, on the Suffolk side of the River Little Ouse, was at first selected as the church of the new priory, dedicated to the Blessed Virgin. A cloister or cells of woodwork were erected for the accommodation of the monks, and Benedictines from the Priory of St Pancras in Lewes arrived in 1104.

Three years later, a new prior realized that the monastic site, surrounded by the houses of the burghers, was inconveniently overcrowded, with no room for a guest-house. Bigod then gave them a pleasant and open site on the other side of the river in the county of Norfolk. The monks relocated to their new premises on St. Martin's Day, 1114. 

In the 13th century, the Virgin Mary is said to have appeared in a vision to locals requesting the addition to the site of a Lady Chapel.  During its construction, an old statue of her from their former site was discovered to have a hollow in its head concealing saints' relics, and became a magnet for pilgrims. In a 1390 visitation, visitors from Cluni found that there were then twenty-two monks; six daily masses, three of which were sung; and that tenth part of the bread was reserved for distribution to the poor. The visitors found that all monastic obligations according to the Cluni rule were duly observed.

During the time of the Dissolution of the Monasteries, a formal complaint was raised by the Mayors and burgesses of Thetford to Thomas Cromwell in 1539, arguing that many of the town's inhabitants would fall into extreme poverty because their livelihoods depended on pilgrims visiting the priory. Henry VIII rejected a plan proposed by Thomas Howard, 3rd Duke of Norfolk to convert the priory into a collegiate church. The dean was to be Prior William, and the six prebendaries and eight secular canons were to be the monks of the former house. Thetford Priory was closed down in 1540 and fell into the possession of the Duke of Norfolk.

Description

It housed the tombs of the Howard dynasty, of Henry FitzRoy, 1st Duke of Richmond and Somerset, and of other early Tudor Dynasty officials.  Even this could not save the priory from the Dissolution of the Monasteries and, on its closure in 1540 (it was one of the last priories to be dissolved), the Howard tombs were removed to St Michael the Archangel, Framlingham.

The Prior’s Lodging was converted into a house which was occupied until the early eighteenth century.

Its ruins (including the lower walls of the church and cloister, along with the impressive shell of the priors' lodging and, reached by a pathway from the main site, an almost complete 14th-century gatehouse) are open to the public as an English Heritage site. The priory and gatehouse are Grade I listed buildings. The ruins are reputedly haunted and were the subject of an episode of the television series Ghosthunters.

Priors
 Malgod, appointed 1104

 Stephen, appointed 1107

 Constantine, occurs 1131

 Martin, occurs 1189

 Peter Vincent, occurs 1202

 Richard, occurs 1226, died c. 1236 (fn. 59)

 Stephen II, occurs 1240, killed 1248 (fn. 61)

 William I, occurs 1262

 Vincent, occurs 1279, died c. 1300 (fn. 64)

 Reginald de Montargi alias de Eye, elected c. 1300

 Ralph de Frezenfeld, appointed 1302

 Thomas Bigod, appointed 1304

 William de Ventodoro, appointed 1308

 Martin de Rinhiaco, appointed 1311

 Peter de Bosco, appointed 1316

 James de Cusancia, occurs 1336

 Geoffrey de Rochario, occurs 1355

 Roger de Berton, occurs 1370

 John de Fordham, occurs 1372, 1395

 John Ixworth, appointed c. 1400

 Nicholas, appointed 1430

 John Vesey, appointed 1438

 Robert Weting, appointed 1480

 Roger Baldry de Bermingham, appointed 1503

 William Ixworth, appointed 1518, last prior.

Local context
The Church of the Holy Sepulchre, another Grade I listed building, and originally part of another medieval monastery, is 300 metres to the south, directly across the River Little Ouse.

Burials
Roger Bigod of Norfolk
Hugh Bigod, 1st Earl of Norfolk
Roger Bigod, 2nd Earl of Norfolk
John Howard, 1st Duke of Norfolk (originally buried here)
Thomas Howard, 2nd Duke of Norfolk (originally buried here)
Agnes Howard, Duchess of Norfolk (originally buried here)
Anne of York (daughter of Edward IV) (originally buried here)
John de Mowbray, 3rd Duke of Norfolk
 Henry FitzRoy, Duke of Richmond and Somerset (originally buried here)

See also
 Alien priory
Wangford Priory
List of monastic houses in Norfolk
List of abbeys and priories in England

Other mediaeval ecclesiastical foundations in Thetford
Austin Friars, Thetford, Southeast of Thetford Castle
Blackfriars, Thetford at the site of Thetford Grammar School
Holy Sepulchre Priory, Thetford between Brandon Road and River Little Ouse
St. George's Priory, Thetford at the site of the British Trust for Ornithology South of Nuns Bridges Road

References

External links

History of Thetford Priory at English Heritage

Monasteries in Norfolk
Cluniac monasteries in England
Religious organizations established in the 1100s
English Heritage sites in Norfolk
Grade I listed buildings in Norfolk
Christian monasteries established in the 12th century
1103 establishments in England
1530s disestablishments in England
Monasteries dissolved under the English Reformation
Thetford